Tiago Pereira da Silva (born 28 October 1993), better known as Tiago Orobó,  is a Brazilian professional footballer who plays as a forward for Daejeon Hana Citizen.

Professional career
Orobó joined the Araripina youth academy at age 16. Orobó made his professional debut with Araripina in a 1-0 Campeonato Pernambucano loss to Belo Jardim on 16 February 2012. He spent most of his early career with various semi-pro clubs in Brazil, before signing with Fortaleza in 2020. Prior to joining Fortaleza, he was in a fine goalscoring form at América de Natal and, previously, spent the latter part of 2019 unemployed and even having a informal job at a bakery. Before the suspension of all football matches in Brazil and worldwide due to the COVID-19 pandemic, he was the top goalscorer of 2020 in Brazil, all competitions counted.

On 17 August 2021, Orobó joined Saudi Arabian club Al-Jabalain. He was released on 13 January 2022.

References

External links
 
 

1993 births
Living people
Sportspeople from Pernambuco
Brazilian footballers
Association football forwards
Araripina Futebol Clube players
Clube Atlético do Porto players
Associação Atlética Coruripe players
Associação Desportiva Confiança players
Campinense Clube players
Qadsia SC players
Maringá Futebol Clube players
América Futebol Clube (RN) players
Fortaleza Esporte Clube players
Londrina Esporte Clube players
Associação Atlética Ponte Preta players
Esporte Clube Jacuipense players
Al-Jabalain FC players
Gyeongnam FC players
Daejeon Hana Citizen FC players
Campeonato Brasileiro Série B players
Campeonato Brasileiro Série C players
Campeonato Brasileiro Série D players
Kuwait Premier League players
Saudi First Division League players
K League 1 players
K League 2 players
Brazilian expatriate footballers
Expatriate footballers in Kuwait
Expatriate footballers in Saudi Arabia
Expatriate footballers in South Korea
Brazilian expatriate sportspeople in Kuwait
Brazilian expatriate sportspeople in Saudi Arabia
Brazilian expatriate sportspeople in South Korea